Mačiulis is the masculine form of a Lithuanian family name. Its feminine forms  are: Mačiulienė (married woman or widow) and Mačiulytė (unmarried woman).

The surname may refer to:

Jonas Mačiulis, Lithuanian professional basketball player
Maironis, Lithuanian poet,  birth name Jonas Mačiulis
Teklė Mačiulienė, chief editor of Kauno diena newspaper (1987–1998), recipient of medal Už nuopelnus žurnalistikai ("For Merits in Journalism")

Lithuanian-language surnames